The  New York Giants season was the franchise's 58th season in the National Football League, but was shortened to nine games due to the 1982 NFL Players Strike.

The season saw the Giants attempting to improve on a 9–7 record from 1981, a season in which they had made the playoffs for the first time since 1963 and also clinched their first winning record since 1972. However, the Giants stumbled out the gates early, starting 0–2 before the strike occurred. After the strike ended, the Giants won four of their last seven games, but missed the playoffs because of losing two tiebreakers against the Saints and the Lions (who both ended with identical 4–5 records). The Giants lost the tiebreakers based on best conference record. The Lions went 4–4 against NFC teams, while the Giants and Saints both went 3–5 against NFC teams. The Lions won the tiebreaker over the Saints, thus eliminating the Saints and Giants from playoff contention and putting the Lions into the playoffs as the final wild card spot in the NFC. This was the nineteenth season out of the last twenty that the Giants missed the playoffs.

Offseason

NFL Draft

Personnel

Staff

Roster

Regular season

Schedule 

Note: Intra-division opponents are in bold text.

Standings

Season summary

Week 12 at Lions

Week 14 vs Eagles

Week 17 at Eagles 

Ray Perkins last game as Giants head coach

See also 
 List of New York Giants seasons

References 

 New York Giants on Pro Football Reference
 Giants on jt-sw.com

New York Giants seasons
New York Giants
New York Giants season
20th century in East Rutherford, New Jersey
Meadowlands Sports Complex